Water Research is a peer-reviewed scientific journal covering research on the science and technology of water quality and its management. It was established in 1967 and is published by Elsevier on behalf of the International Water Association. The editor-in-chief is Eberhard Morgenroth (Swiss Federal Institute of Aquatic Science and Technology).

Abstracting and indexing
The journal is abstracted and indexed in:

According to the Journal Citation Reports, the journal has a 2020 impact factor of 11.236.

See also
List of periodicals published by Elsevier

References

External links

Hydrology journals
Elsevier academic journals
English-language journals
Publications established in 1967